"Hand of Doom" is a song by Black Sabbath.

Hand of Doom may also refer to:

 "Hand of Doom", a song by Carnal Forge from Please... Die!
 "Hand of Doom", a song by Manowar from Warriors of the World
 Hand of Doom, a Black Sabbath tribute band fronted by Melissa Auf der Maur

See also 
 "The Hands of Doom (Skit)", a song by MF Doom from Operation: Doomsday
 Red Hand of Doom, an adventure for the role-playing game Dungeons & Dragons
 Hellboy: The Right Hand of Doom, a trade-paperback collection in the Hellboy comics series